Nathan James Bishop (born 15 October 1999) is an English professional footballer who plays as a goalkeeper for  club Manchester United. He has previously played in the English Football League for Southend United and Mansfield Town.

Club career

Southend United
Bishop was born in Hillingdon, Greater London. He joined Southend United at a young age and first appeared in the first-team squad towards the end of the 2016–17 campaign, appearing as an unused substitute. Following this, Bishop spent time on trial at West Ham United, but was unable to secure a contract and instead returned to Southend for the 2017–18 campaign.

On 23 December 2017, Bishop went on to make his professional debut during Southend's 3–1 away defeat against Scunthorpe United, replacing the injured Mark Oxley at half-time.

Manchester United
Bishop signed for Premier League club Manchester United on 31 January 2020 for an undisclosed fee on a two-and-a-half-year contract.

Mansfield Town (loan)
On 24 June 2021, it was announced that Bishop would join Mansfield Town on loan for the 2021–22 season. Bishop played in 53 of Mansfield's competitive games in his season there, including in the EFL League Two Play-off Final, which ultimately ended in a 3–0 defeat to Port Vale.

International career
Bishop was called up to the England under-20 squad midway through the 2019 Toulon Tournament as a replacement for Ryan Schofield and made his debut in the 4–0 win over Guatemala on 11 June 2019.

Career statistics

Honours
Manchester United
UEFA Europa League runner-up: 2020–21

References

External links
 

1999 births
Living people
Footballers from Hillingdon
English footballers
Association football goalkeepers
Southend United F.C. players
Manchester United F.C. players
Mansfield Town F.C. players
English Football League players
England youth international footballers